Eldon is a surname which may refer to:

 Dan Eldon (1970-1993), former British photojournalist stoned to death by a mob in Mogadishu
 David Eldon (born 1945), former Chairman of The Hong Kong and Shanghai Banking Corporation
 Kevin Eldon (born 1960), English actor and comedian
 Stan Eldon (born 1936), British former Cross-Country champion
 Stewart Eldon, British former diplomat, former Ambassador to Ireland and Ambassador to NATO
 Thor Eldon, Icelandic/American singer, member of The Sugarcubes

See also
Eldin (disambiguation), includes list of people with name Eldin
Elden (name)